Kalateh-ye Hajji may refer to:
 Kalateh-ye Hajji, Razavi Khorasan